Jacob Karl Rodger Schmid (born 18 January 1994) is an Australian professional track sprint cyclist from Melbourne, Victoria. He represented Australia at the 2018 Commonwealth Games, where he won bronze in the elite men's individual sprint and team sprint (alongside Nathan Hart, Patrick Constable and Matthew Glaetzer).

As a junior rider, Schmid competed at the 2012 UCI Junior World Track Cycling Championships in Invercargill (New Zealand), where he won gold in the individual sprint and keirin events. He was also a member of the junior men's team sprint (alongside Emerson Harwood and Zachary Shaw), which qualified fastest in a junior world record time (44.825s), before an illegal change saw the team relegated in the gold medal final.

References

External links
 

1994 births
Living people
Australian male cyclists
Place of birth missing (living people)
Commonwealth Games medallists in cycling
Commonwealth Games bronze medallists for Australia
Cyclists at the 2018 Commonwealth Games
People from Malvern, Victoria
Cyclists from Melbourne
Medallists at the 2018 Commonwealth Games